Qaleh Juq (also Romanized as Qal‘eh Jūq and Qal‘eh-ye Jūq) is a village in Azghand Rural District, Shadmehr District, Mahvelat County, Razavi Khorasan Province, Iran. At the 2006 census, its population was 517, in 165 families.

References 

Populated places in Mahvelat County